The Evian Championship is an annual women's golf competition. It became a major in 2013.

Champions

See also
Chronological list of LPGA major golf champions
List of LPGA major championship winning golfers

Cham
Evian
Golf in France